John Gretton, 1st Baron Gretton,  (1 September 1867 – 2 June 1947) was a British businessman and Conservative politician.  Gretton won two gold medals in the 1900 Olympic Games. He served as a Member of Parliament (MP) for 46 years, representing three constituencies in that period.

Life and career
Gretton was the eldest son of John Gretton of Stapleford Park and Marianne, daughter of Major John Molineux of Brook House, Compton in Surrey. John Gretton was educated at Harrow School. He was appointed chairman of Bass, Ratcliff and Gretton Ltd, the Burton-upon-Trent brewers in 1908 and served until 1945.

Gretton was a volunteer officer in the 2nd Volunteer Battalion, The (Prince of Wales's) North Staffordshire Regiment, and served as lieutenant-colonel and colonel when this became the 6th battalion, North Staffordshire Regiment in the Territorial Army from 1907. He was appointed a captain in the Reserve on 24 February 1900. At the outbreak of the First World War, he was confirmed as temporary colonel in command of the 6th battalion. In 1920, the War Office appointed Lord Gretton as Lieutenant-colonel Reserve Officer until demobilised in 1922.

In 1895, he was elected to the House of Commons as Member of Parliament (MP) for Derbyshire South, a seat he held until 1906. He then represented Rutland from the 1907 by-election to 1918 and Burton from 1918 to 1943, when he was appointed an Officer of the Order of St John (OStJ). Gretton was made a CBE in 1919 and admitted to the Privy Council in 1926. In 1944, he was raised to the peerage as Baron Gretton, of Stapleford in the County of Leicester. He was a Deputy Lieutenant of Derbyshire.

Lord Gretton precipitated by a speech the Carlton Club revolt that brought down the Lloyd George Coalition Cabinet in the British Parliament in 1922. In 1929, he forced the British Government to honour its pledge of compensation to the Irish Loyalists.

In 1940, Lord Gretton precipitated by a speech the fall of the Neville Chamberlain Government and its replacement by a Coalition. Lord Gretton was a leading champion of the Second World War as a crusade of good versus evil, and a war against the German nation before the Winston Churchill era. He was identified by the press as "an old Tory".

Lord Gretton married on 19 April 1900 The Hon. Maud Helen Eveleigh de Moleyns, youngest daughter of The 4th Baron Ventry, an Anglo-Irish peer.  The couple had three children:

 John Frederic 
 Kathleen Fanny married on 9 April 1929 Brigadier Sir Henry Robert Kincaid Floyd, 5th Baronet Floyd
 Mary Catherine Hersey married on 19 July 1933 Capt Edward William Brook, 20th Hussars, only son of Lt-Col Charles Brook of Meltham Mills, Yorkshire and Kinmount House, Dumfries.

He died in June 1947 in Melton Mowbray, aged 79, and was succeeded in the barony by his son John Gretton, 2nd Baron Gretton.

A noted yachtsman, Gretton won two gold medals in the 1900 Olympic Games. He is unique in winning an Olympic gold medal whilst serving as a member of the House of Commons. (John Wodehouse, MP for Mid Norfolk 1906–10, won a silver medal at the 1908 Olympic Games.)

Arms

References

External links 

 
 
 
 

1867 births
1947 deaths
People educated at Harrow School
People from Burton upon Trent
British male sailors (sport)
Olympic sailors of Great Britain
English Olympic medallists
Olympic gold medallists for Great Britain
Olympic medalists in sailing
Sailors at the 1900 Summer Olympics – .5 to 1 ton
Sailors at the 1900 Summer Olympics – Open class
Medalists at the 1900 Summer Olympics
Commanders of the Order of the British Empire
Conservative Party (UK) MPs for English constituencies
Deputy Lieutenants of Derbyshire
Members of the Parliament of the United Kingdom for constituencies in Derbyshire
UK MPs 1895–1900
UK MPs 1900–1906
UK MPs 1906–1910
UK MPs 1910
UK MPs 1910–1918
UK MPs 1918–1922
UK MPs 1922–1923
UK MPs 1923–1924
UK MPs 1924–1929
UK MPs 1929–1931
UK MPs 1931–1935
UK MPs 1935–1945
UK MPs who were granted peerages
British sportsperson-politicians
Members of the Privy Council of the United Kingdom
Barons created by George VI